Women

Junior

Cadet

Cadet - Girls

Chess competitions